Glossophaga  (long-tongued bat) is a genus of bats in the leaf-nosed bat family, Phyllostomidae.   Members of the genus are native to the American Neotropics.

Species
G. antillarum (Rehn, 1902): Jamaican long-tongued bat, Jamaica.
G. bakeri (Webster & J. K. Jones, 1987): Baker's long-tongued bat, South America.
G. commissarisi (Gardner, 1962): Commissaris's long-tongued bat - Central and South America.
G. leachii (Gray, 1844): gray long-tongued bat - Mexico, Central America.
G. longirostris (Miller, 1898): Miller's long-tongued bat - Northern South America, Windward Islands.
G. morenoi (Martinez & Villa, 1938): western long-tongued bat - Mexico.
G. mutica (Merriam, 1898): Merriam's long-tongued bat, Mexico, Central America, northern South America
G. soricina (Pallas, 1766): Pallas's long-tongued bat - Central and South America.
G. valens (Miller, 1913): Ecuadorian long-tongued bat - Ecuador and Peru.

References

 
Bat genera
Taxa named by Étienne Geoffroy Saint-Hilaire